Johnnie B. "Dusty" Baker Jr. (born June 15, 1949) is an American baseball manager and former player who is the manager of the Houston Astros in Major League Baseball (MLB). He previously played in the MLB for 19 seasons, most notably with the Los Angeles Dodgers. During his Dodgers tenure, he was a two-time All-Star, won two Silver Slugger Awards and a Gold Glove Award, and became the first NLCS MVP, which he received during the 1977 National League Championship Series. He also made three World Series appearances, winning one in 1981.

After retiring as a player, Baker served as the manager of the San Francisco Giants from 1993 to 2002, the Chicago Cubs from 2003 to 2006, the Cincinnati Reds from 2008 to 2013, and Washington Nationals from 2016 to 2017. He has served as the manager of the Astros since 2020. Baker won the 2022 World Series with the Astros and is the oldest manager to win a championship in the four major North American sports. He is also the first MLB manager to reach the playoffs and win a division title with five different teams, having accomplished both feats with each team he managed. In addition to his 2022 championship, Baker appeared in the World Series with the Giants in 2002 and the Astros in 2021, making him the ninth manager to win pennants in both the American and National Leagues. Baker ranks ninth in MLB managerial wins and has the most wins among African American managers.

Early life
Baker grew up in Riverside, California, as the oldest of five children. He earned the nickname "Dusty" from his mother because of his propensity for playing in a dirt spot in the backyard. His father worked as an Air Force sheet-metal technician at Norton Air Force Base. Baker played a variety of sports growing up, describing basketball as his very first love while also playing sports such as baseball, with his father being his coach for Little League, although this did not stop the elder Baker from kicking his son off of teams because of his tantrums. When the younger Baker wanted to quit baseball and have a paper route, his father told him that he did not raise a son who was a quitter as a way to try to encourage him to spin his attitude into a positive direction. In 1963, when Dusty was 14 years old, the Baker family moved to the Sacramento area near McClellan Air Force Base. Baker grew up as a fan of the Los Angeles Dodgers and described Tommy Davis as his hero, but the signing of Bobby Bonds in 1968 made him a fan of the San Francisco Giants.

Baker excelled in baseball, basketball, football, and track in Del Campo High School near Sacramento, California; and he was inducted into the Sac-Joaquin Section's Hall of Fame class in 2010 for his play at Del Campo. As such, he was offered a basketball scholarship by Santa Clara University. His father was so committed to his son going to college that he went around and told scouts that his son would go to college and play either football or basketball, as opposed to them wasting a draft pick on Baker. The one scout who saw something in Baker was Bill Wight, as he knew the situation between Baker and his family, which had just seen his father and mother go through a divorce that worried Baker about potentially being a burden to his parents. He was drafted by the Atlanta Braves in the 1967 amateur draft, despite his prayers to not play in the Deep South. On June 19 of that year, the Braves tasked Hank Aaron to try to influence Baker to sign with the team, with Aaron promising to both Baker and his mother Christine that he would take care of Baker as if he was his own son, while guaranteeing that Baker would be in the majors before his college class graduated. Baker decided to sign with the team to the anger of his father, who sued to nullify the contract (and the $15,000 signing bonus), which led to a decision where the State of California appointed a trustee over his finances until his 21st birthday. Baker did not speak to his father for three years nor reconcile for a few years after that; seeing how his finances were invested softened Baker's perception of his father along with inspiring him to become a stockbroker for a time later in life.

Playing career

Atlanta Braves

As an outfielder, Baker played his first baseball games in the Texas League in Austin in the AA classification, playing nine games in 1967. He then played in the Western Carolinas League and the Florida State League (mostly in the former) before playing six games in the majors the following year. It was also during the year that Baker would serve as a Marine Corps Reserve in motor transport mechanics, as suggested by the team; he would do so for six years.  He made his debut as a call-up on September 7, 1968, against the Houston Astros. He went 0-for-1, and he appeared in five other games that year and collected two hits. He played in the minors for most of the next three seasons, playing just 45 games for the major league Braves during that time while batting over .300 for the Triple-A Richmond Braves in 1970 and 1971. Finally, Baker made the roster for Opening Day in 1972 to get a true start to his major league career. He played in 127 games while batting .321 (third best in the National League) with 143 hits, seventeen home runs and 76 runs batted in (RBI); he received votes for Most Valuable Player, finishing 22nd. It was during the 1970s that Baker played for the Yaquis de Obregón of the Mexican Pacific League in the offseason, stating it was the toughest league that he ever played in professionally. The following year, he would play in 159 games (a career high) and batted .288 while collecting 174 hits with 101 runs, 21 home runs, and 99 runs batted in with 24 stolen bases (the latter two were career highs). He played two further seasons with the Braves, batting over .255 in each as the center fielder, but it was a moment on April 8, 1974, that earned him a place in history. On that day Baker batted fifth in the lineup behind Hank Aaron. In the fourth inning, with Baker on deck, Aaron hit a shot to left field off Al Downing for his 715th home run to pass Babe Ruth in career home runs. After expressing a desire to be traded upon the closure of the 1975 season, Baker was traded on November 17, 1975, along with Ed Goodson to the Los Angeles Dodgers for Lee Lacy, Tom Paciorek, Jerry Royster and Jimmy Wynn.

Los Angeles Dodgers
Many of Baker's accomplishments as a player would come during his time with the Los Angeles Dodgers, where he spent the next eight seasons. His tenure began in 1976 with a meager .242 batting average in 112 games that saw him collect just 93 hits with 39 RBIs while suffering a problem with his stretched knee ligaments that required surgery after the season ended. However, he bounced back in 1977 by playing in 153 games that saw him bat .291 with 155 hits, thirty home runs and 86 runs batted in. It is believed that Baker played an integral part in the first-ever high five, which occurred between Baker and Dodgers teammate Glenn Burke on October 2, 1977, at Dodger Stadium, a story featured in the ESPN 30 for 30 documentary The High Five (2014), directed by Michael Jacobs. Vaunted historian and athletics instructor Dennis Pirkle disputes Baker's origin of the high five.

Baker would see the postseason for the first time in his career as the Dodgers won the National League West that season. The Dodgers faced the Philadelphia Phillies in the NLCS. Baker proved key in Game 2 when he hit a grand slam in the fourth inning to break a 1–1 tie that the Dodgers won 7–1. His second and last home run of the series proved just as important, as he hit a two-run shot off Steve Carlton in the second inning of Game 4 in a game the Dodgers won 4–1 to clinch the National League pennant. In total, he went 5-of-14 (.357) while driving in eight runs. For his efforts, he was awarded the first-ever National League Championship Series (NLCS) Most Valuable Player (MVP) award. The Dodgers faced the New York Yankees in the 1977 World Series. Baker collected one home run in the series (Game 3) while going 7-for-24 (.292) with five runs batted in, but the Dodgers lost the Series in six games. In the 1978 season, he batted .262 while collecting 137 hits.  The Dodgers and Phillies met up for a rematch. The result would be the same, as the Dodgers won the pennant in four games, and Baker went 7-of-15 (.467) with one run batted in. In the 1978 World Series, they met the Yankees again, with the same result for Baker and the Dodgers (complete with him hitting only one home run) as he batted .238 in the six-game loss.

Baker batted .274 in 1979 before improving in 1980 with heightened contact, as he batted .294 with 170 hits, 29 home runs and 97 RBIs. He finished fourth in MVP voting while winning the Silver Slugger Award. The 1981 season was shortened by a strike that saw a first and second half division champion, but Baker and the Dodgers were not slowed down. He played in 103 games and batted a career high .320 with 128 hits and 49 RBIs that saw him named to his first All-Star Game. He was also awarded the Silver Slugger Award and the Gold Glove Award while finishing seventh in MVP voting. The Dodgers won the first half NL West title and thus were matched against the second half champion in the Houston Astros. Baker batted .167 in the Division Series, but the Dodgers won in five games. In the Championship Series against the Montreal Expos, he batted .316 with three runs batted in as the Dodgers won in a closely contested five-game series to win their third pennant in four years. Facing the New York Yankees in the 1981 World Series, Baker batted just .167 with one run batted in, but the Dodgers won in six games to win the title. The following year, Baker batted .300 in 147 games with 171 hits, 23 home runs and 88 RBIs to make his second and final All-Star Game. He closed out his Dodgers career in 1983 by batting .260 with 138 hits; curiously, this was the first season since 1975 where he drew more walks than strikeouts (in this case walking a career high 72 times with 59 strikeouts). In the NLCS, he batted .357 while hitting a home run for his fifth and final career postseason home run; the Dodgers lost in four games.

Closing years
He became a free agent after the season and signed with the San Francisco Giants for the 1984 season. He played 100 games that year and batted .292 with 71 hits and three home runs. He was traded to the Oakland Athletics on March 24, 1985, for two minor league players. While he would play the outfield during his time there, he also played first base at times, playing 61 games of his tenure at the position while also serving as a designated hitter for 28 total games. He played 111 games in 1985 and batted .268 with fourteen home runs and 52 RBIs. He played sparingly for his final season in 1986 with 83 games and a .240 batting average. He appeared in his final game on October 4, 1986, against the Kansas City Royals; he went 0-for-1 with two walks before being taken out for a pinch-runner in the seventh inning. While the Athletics offered to send him down to Triple-A for the 1987 season, Baker elected for free agency instead and subsequently retired.

In a career that spanned nineteen years, Baker played in 2,039 games while collecting 1,981 hits, 242 home runs and 1,013 runs batted in while never going on the disabled list. Baker is noted for his love of toothpicks, saying, "Toothpicks are an excellent source of protein" while chewing at least one every game. He also uses the toothpick as a way to deter use of chewing tobacco, which he used as a player. In his final season of 1986, he began wearing a wristband (featuring his face), which he has continued to do as manager; he has stated it is to help wipe perspiration off his forehead.

Managerial career

San Francisco Giants

Baker was working as a stockbroker in 1987 when he received a call from Hank Aaron, Joe Morgan, and Frank Robinson to go to Dallas, Texas to try to get jobs for minority baseball players after they finished their playing careers, which came in the wake of controversial remarks by Dodgers general manager Al Campanis on April 6, 1987. While in Dallas trying to find jobs for players, Bob Kennedy, senior baseball operations executive for the San Francisco Giants, told Baker that Al Rosen, general manager of the Giants, asked to see Baker about a possible job. On the advice of his father, Baker, alongside his brother and daughter, set out to Lake Arrowhead to pray and seek guidance to decide whether he should see Rosen and possibly return to baseball. However, while checking into the hotel, Baker encountered Bob Lurie, owner of the Giants, which seemed a sign for Baker to take an opportunity, if offered. When Baker eventually met with Rosen, Rosen stated interest in having him serve as a first base coach, which differed from Baker stating interest in possibly being an assistant general manager because Rosen thought he would be better suited to manage on the field. Baker set out a goal to try and manage within five years or he would step down. Baker's coaching career started as a first base coach for the Giants in 1988, and then he spent the following four years (1989–1992) as the hitting coach. In 1992, he managed the Scottsdale Scorpions in the Arizona Fall League.

In 1992, Giants manager Roger Craig was fired while Bob Quinn was named general manager (the week prior, Rosen resigned) by the new ownership that was led by Peter Magowan. On December 16, 1992, Baker was hired to manage the club, becoming the seventh black manager hired to manage a Major League Baseball team. He beat out four other candidates in John Wathan, Davey Lopes, Tom Trebelhorn, and Ron Gardenhire. In his first year as Giants manager, the team had acquired Barry Bonds the same month Baker was promoted. Baker 
would win the NL Manager of the Year award (until 2021, he was the only Giant to win the award), leading the team to a 103–59 record. However, it was not enough for a playoff berth. They had led the National League West by  games on August 7, but they ended up losing the National League West to the Atlanta Braves. The Giants lost 12–1 on the final day of the season when a win could have forced a tiebreaking game with Atlanta for the division championship (the following year, a Wild Card was instituted in both leagues). It was the second-best record in baseball that year behind the 104–58 Atlanta Braves and 31 games better than their 72–90 finish the previous season. He was the first manager since Sparky Anderson (1970) to win 100 games as a rookie manager, and the fourth to do so. Since the Giants missed the playoffs (as only the division winners qualified before 1995), he also became the eighth and so far the last manager to lead a team to 100 wins without making it to the postseason.

His Giants went on to win division titles in 1997, and again in 2000; Baker won Manager of the Year honors in both of those years as well. He was the second person to win the award three times after Tony La Russa, and the first to do so with the same team all three times. His easy-going style of managing led to a description of him as a "player's manager", to where he learned Spanish to try to help relate to his players. It was also during his San Francisco tenure that the term "Dustiny" was coined by former Giants pitcher Rod Beck. However, the postseason would elude Baker and the Giants, as they fell in the NLDS in 1997 and 2000 while losing a tie-breaker game for the Wild Card spot in 1998.

In 2002, his Giants won 95 games and clinched the Wild Card by 3½ games. In the 2002 National League Division Series, they faced the Atlanta Braves. The two teams split the first four games before a pivotal Game 5 in Atlanta, which the Giants won 3–1 to deliver their first postseason series victory since 1989. The Giants faced the St. Louis Cardinals (who had beaten the Arizona Diamondbacks, the defending champions) in the 2002 National League Championship Series. The Giants won the series in five games for their first pennant in eleven years, winning on a walk-off single by Kenny Lofton. They advanced to the World Series against the Anaheim Angels, who were managed by his former Dodger teammate Mike Scioscia. The teams split the first two games in Anaheim before going to San Francisco. In Game 3, they were routed 10–4, but the Giants responded with a narrow 4–3 victory in Game 4 before a big win in Game 5 by a score of 16–4. The Giants were one victory away from the championship and had two games in Anaheim to do so. The Giants struck first in Game 6, scoring three runs in the fifth inning before adding runs in the sixth and seventh inning to make it 5–0. However, the seventh would start the unraveling of the game; in the inning, starting pitcher Russ Ortiz (who had 98 pitches) allowed consecutive singles after getting one out before Baker pulled him out for Félix Rodríguez. Scott Spiezio came up to the plate and soon hit a shot to right field to narrow the score to 5–3. In the next inning, Darin Erstad hit a leadoff line-drive shot for a home run before Tim Salmon and Garret Anderson hit singles that made Baker put in Robb Nen (battling a shoulder injury for most of the year) to try and close out the inning without allowing more runs. However, a double by Troy Glaus scored the runners to give the Angels a lead they would not relinquish. The five run deficit was the largest comeback in an elimination game in the World Series. While the Giants scored first in Game 7, the Angels scored three runs in the third inning to build a cushion on their way to a 4–1 victory.

Despite Baker's success in San Francisco, he had an increasingly strained relationship with owner Peter Magowan, one that even the Giants' first pennant in 13 years could not mend. The Giants did not renew his contract after the season, letting him leave to manage the Chicago Cubs and hiring Felipe Alou to replace him. Baker finished his tenure with a record of 840 wins and 715 losses in the regular season and 11 wins and 13 losses in the post-season.

To date, Baker is one of only four African Americans to manage a World Series team. Cito Gaston was the first, managing the Toronto Blue Jays to championships in 1992 and 1993. Baker was the second, and Ron Washington and Dave Roberts have since joined Gaston and Baker by managing the Texas Rangers and Los Angeles Dodgers, respectively, to the World Series, with Roberts winning a championship in 2020. Baker left as the all-time winningest manager in the San Francisco era of Giants history; Bruce Bochy would later eclipse him alongside managing the Giants to World Series titles in 2010, 2012 and 2014.

Chicago Cubs

Baker was speculated to be hired by thr Chicago Cubs as soon as he was let go from the Giants. Cubs general manager Jim Hendry interviewed several managers for their open position such as Bob Melvin, Ken Macha, Buck Showalter and Fredi Gonzalez, but Hendry went with his first name in mind with Baker. On November 15, 2002, he was hired by the Chicago Cubs to a four-year deal to manage the team, replacing Bruce Kimm, who had taken over when Don Baylor was fired in the middle of the third 90-loss season in a four-year span.

Baker would make a major impact in his first season as manager for the Cubs in 2003. In July of that year, Baker was the subject of some controversy when he stated that "black and Hispanic players are better suited to playing in the sun and heat than white players." Baker, defending his beliefs, later said, "What I meant is that blacks and Latinos take the heat better than most whites, and whites take the cold better than most blacks and Latinos. That's it, pure and simple. Nothing deeper than that."  With the help of an impressive pitching staff and big gun batters such as Sammy Sosa and Moisés Alou, the Cubs claimed their first division title in fourteen years. Baker led the Cubs to victory over the Atlanta Braves in the National League Division Series, the first postseason series victory for the team since the 1908 World Series. However, the hopes for the Cubs winning a World Series title were cut short during the 2003 National League Championship Series against the Florida Marlins. In Game 6, with Chicago five outs away from the pennant and holding a 3–0 lead, the infamous Steve Bartman foul ball incident near the fans in left field would unravel the Cubs and derail the chance for their first World Series appearance in 58 years. The Bartman incident proved to be a distraction for fans and the media, but it was critical execution failures by the Cubs such as a wild pitch on a ball four, a fielding error on a potential inning-ending double play, and a bad throw from the outfield after a Marlins hit, which allowed the visitors from Miami to score eight runs in that eighth inning to win the game 8–3; Cubs player Doug Glanville also stated that the loss in Game 5 (where Josh Beckett threw a two-hit shutout) was the true turning point of the series. The Marlins would go on to win Game 7 at Wrigley Field on their way to winning the 2003 World Series.

In 2004, the team was involved in a heated wild card chase with the Houston Astros but fell out of contention near the season's end, losing six of their last eight games and missing the playoffs by three games. He also received criticism from television analyst Steve Stone, who blamed Baker for his players harassing him at team charters and hotels, which Baker waved off as being "grown men". On August 30, Baker won his 1,000th game as manager with a win over the Montreal Expos, doing so in his 1,848th game.

In 2005, the Cubs lost several of their key players, most notably ace pitchers Mark Prior and Kerry Wood, to injuries. The team finished the season with a 79–83 record, marking the first time in three years that the Cubs finished with a losing record. The Cubs’ performance continued to decline in 2006 as they fell to 66–96 and finished last in the entire National League. Baker, an old-school baseball traditionalist, was scrutinized for the Cubs' declining productivity. Baker has said that putting men on base can be unimportant and merely "clogging up the bases." This position has made Baker a target among the sabermetric community. It was around this time that Baker came under scrutiny for his tendency to overuse pitchers, such as with Kerry Wood and Mark Prior. Wood and Prior suffered serious arm injuries following their first full seasons under Baker. Wood and Prior averaged 122 and 126 pitches per start, respectively, in their final six regular-season starts of 2003. However, the only season where Wood was used for a full season under Baker's tenure was in 2003, in which he pitched 211 innings, which was two innings more than he had pitched in 2002. In the next three seasons, Wood would only pitched a combined total of 226 innings due to injuries before the Cubs decided to try him as a reliever after 2006. Additionally, Wood and Prior have been quoted as not blaming Baker for what happened with his career, with Prior stating that he had to balance pitcher use with the decisions required to try and help the Cubs win games. Prior also cited him as an inspiration to stay in the game after he retired from pitching, with Baker describing baseball as a relationship.

A month after the 2006 season ended, the Cubs declined to renew Baker's contract. They allowed Baker to address the media in a press conference in early October, where he officially announced his departure. The Cubs turned to Lou Piniella to replace Baker for the 2007 season. Baker finished his tenure with a regular-season record of 322 wins and 326 losses and a postseason record of six wins and six losses.

Cincinnati Reds

On October 13, 2007, Baker was hired as manager of the Cincinnati Reds, replacing interim manager Pete Mackanin. He was the first black manager in Cincinnati Reds history; the Reds hired Baker on the heels of having fired Jerry Narron after another losing season (Baker became the fifth Reds manager since the year of 2003), with Baker being the first Reds manager hired with no prior ties to the organization since 1990. Baker and the Reds finished 74–88 and 78–84 in 2008 and 2009, finishing 5th and 4th in the NL Central. In 2010, the Reds enjoyed success as one of baseball's breakout teams (which included first baseman Joey Votto being named Most Valuable Player of the National League), and on September 28, 2010, the Reds won the Central title. This championship led to their first playoff appearance in 15 years. However, the appearance was short-lived as the Reds were swept by the Philadelphia Phillies in the NLDS. Baker signed a two-year contract extension with the Reds on October 4, 2010.

The Reds won 97 games in 2012 to win the National League Central for the second time in three seasons (only the Washington Nationals won more games than the Reds that year in the NL). During September 2012, Baker stayed in a Chicago hospital for treatment of an irregular heartbeat. At the time, Baker had been dealing with a longstanding heart problem. The Reds clinched the 2012 Central Division championship in his absence, their second in three years and Baker's fifth as a manager. In the 2012 National League Division Series, the Reds faced the San Francisco Giants. The Reds beat the Giants 5–2 and 9–0 in San Francisco to lead the series heading back to Cincinnati. Game 3 turned out to be a tight affair with the Reds on the wrong side of it, as a bobbled play by Scott Rolen led to the winning run by the Giants, and they tied the series with an 8–3 victory in Game 4. In Game 5, the Reds collapse became complete, as the Giants scored six runs in the fifth inning to win 6–4, making them the second team in NLDS history to blow a 2–0 series lead (after 1981) and the third team ever to blow a 2–0 lead in a best-of-five series. On October 15, 2012, he signed a two-year contract extension as manager of the Reds.

In 2013, the Reds won ninety games, but it was only good enough for a third place finish in the division (the Cardinals won the division by seven games), and a five-game losing streak closed out the regular season. As such, they were the second Wild Card team and faced the division rival Pittsburgh Pirates (who won 94 games) in Wild Card game. Baker was fired by the Reds three days after the game. The Pirates, making their first postseason appearance since 1992, took the lead in the second inning and never relinquished it, cruising to a 6–2 victory. Reds general manager Walt Jocketty admitted the team's latest collapse played a role in the decision to fire Baker. On October 22, 2013, he was replaced by Reds pitching coach Bryan Price.

Washington Nationals

In the two year gap between jobs, Baker called multiple franchises looking to fill their respective vacancies, such as the Detroit Tigers, the Seattle Mariners, and the San Diego Padres, but only the latter even gave him a callback (they later hired Andy Green).

On November 3, 2015, Baker was named the new manager for the Washington Nationals for the 2016 season, his first managerial position since being fired by Cincinnati in 2013; he was hired to replace Matt Williams after a deal with Bud Black fell through.  At the time of his hiring, he was the only black manager in Major League Baseball and had the second-highest total for most wins in MLB. Comments made shortly after his hire raised attention when he suggested his Washington Nationals should field more players of color as "you've got a better chance of getting some speed with Latin and African-Americans." Baker said of the comments, "I'm not being racist. That's just how it is." The hire came with scrutiny that Baker would overuse pitchers as he was alleged to do before, but it was noted that his prior Reds teams featured players throwing fewer pitches, and some baseball writers have noted that there is no clear link between pitches thrown and injuries suffered.

The Nationals won the NL East in Baker's first season with 95 wins (a twelve game improvement), which was the third time the team had won the NL East in the last five seasons. However, the Nationals lost in the NLDS in five games against the Los Angeles Dodgers after losing Game 4 and Game 5 (in the latter game, the Nationals gave up four runs in the seventh inning in a 4–3 loss). The following season, Baker led the Nationals to another NL East Championship. However, their postseason was once again cut short after losing in the 2017 NLDS to the Chicago Cubs in five games. Game 5 saw the Nationals lead 4–1 by the time of the second inning, but the game turned wildly in the fifth inning with four runs that were all scored on two outs, which included multiple hits, a passed ball, an error, catcher's interference, and a hit batter. While the Nationals tried to rally, the Cubs prevailed 9–8. The fifth game was the tenth time in fourteen years where a Baker-managed team had lost a "close-out" game with the opportunity to advance to the next round of the playoffs, which was a record; in both NLDS matchups, the Nationals had outscored their opponent but lost the series. On October 20, 2017, the Nationals announced that Baker and his entire coaching staff would not return as the team's manager in 2018.

Houston Astros
In 2020, Baker was one of three finalists for the Philadelphia Phillies job, alongside Joe Girardi and Buck Showalter, but Girardi got the job.

On January 13, 2020, the position for the managerial spot of the Houston Astros opened up, as A. J. Hinch had been fired in the wake of the Astros sign stealing scandal. Candidates for the position included Showalter, John Gibbons, Joe Espada, and Will Venable. On January 29, Baker was hired, becoming the third manager to be hired after the age of seventy and first since Jack McKeon; he is also the first manager in the two-league era to have coached over 3,000 games in one league before managing a single game in the other, as this was his first managerial job in the American League. The contract was for one year with a club option for a second year.

On July 28, 2020 (four days after the season started), the Astros picked up the 2021 option on Baker's contract. On September 25, the Astros clinched a playoff spot as the sixth seed in the pandemic-shortened season. Baker became the first baseball manager to lead five teams to the postseason. He also became the first manager to lead a team that finished under .500 in the postseason to a series win, having beaten both the Minnesota Twins and the Oakland Athletics to reach the American League Championship Series (ALCS).  It was the first time since 2003 that a Baker-led team had made the League Championship Series.  The Astros lost to the Tampa Bay Rays in seven games after having come back from 3–0. Baker's appearance in Game 7 (a winner-take-all) was his ninth as manager, setting a new record for most appearances by a manager in a winner-take-all game, although Baker has only won two of those games.

On April 22, 2021, Baker secured his 1,900th win as a manager in the regular season, becoming the 14th manager to do so with an 8–2 victory over the Los Angeles Angels. Four days later, he passed Gene Mauch for 13th on the all-time wins list with a 5–2 win over the Seattle Mariners. On April 30, he passed Casey Stengel for 12th all-time with a 9–2 win over the Tampa Bay Rays, the teams' first meeting since the previous year's ALCS.

By winning the American League West division in 2021, Baker became the first manager in the major leagues to guide five different clubs to division titles. In the playoffs, the Astros first played the Chicago White Sox in the American League Division Series (ALDS).  The White Sox were led by Tony La Russa, who Baker had faced as manager over 200 times previously, and whose careers both had intertwined and spanned more than five decades. They met most frequently in games in the National League Central when La Russa managed the St. Louis Cardinals, and Baker managed the Cubs and Reds.

The Astros faced the Boston Red Sox in the American League Championship Series (ALCS) for the AL pennant. On October 22, 2021, the Astros won Game 6 of the series to clinch the pennant, doing so in a dramatic comeback where they had lost two of the first three games to the Boston Red Sox (who had hit three grand slams in Game 2 and 3 combined) before winning three in a row to advance to the 2021 World Series. The nineteen-year gap between World Series appearances in the second longest all-time between managers (with the only greater one being Bucky Harris), and Baker became the ninth manager in major league history to win a pennant in both leagues. The Astros faced the Atlanta Braves in the Series and lost in six games.

On November 5, 2021, owner Jim Crane announced that Baker had agreed to a one-year extension to manage the club for the 2022 season.  He had managed over 24 major league seasons. On May 3, 2022, Baker won his 2,000th game as a manager with a 4–0 win over the Seattle Mariners at home in Minute Maid Park. Coincidentally, both Baker's first win and his 2,000th win involved the father-son tandem of Peñas in the lineup, as Gerónimo Peña batted leadoff for the St. Louis Cardinals versus the Giants on April 6, 1993, and son Jeremy started the May 3 game as shortstop for the Astros. Baker became the twelfth manager and first African American manager to reach the milestone.  Baker was named manager of the American League in the MLB All-Star Game played at Dodger Stadium in Los Angeles.  The Astros won their 90th game of the season on September 11 versus the Angels, giving Baker a 12th season reaching that threshold in wins as manager. On September 19, the Astros clinched the AL West title, which is Baker's ninth division title as manager. On September 24, the Astros won 11-10 over the Baltimore Orioles, their 100th of the season. It made Baker the fourth manager to have 100-win seasons in both the American and National League, as Baker had achieved the mark with the San Francisco Giants in 1993; Baker went 23 seasons between 100-win seasons, the longest for any manager to have multiple 100-win seasons. On October 2, the Astros won their 104th game, setting a new high in wins for a Baker-managed team.  The Astros finished with a 2.90 ERA as a team, second best in MLB. When asked about what was necessary for good pitching, he stated "Control, control, control. Everybody talks about velocity all the time, but the velocity without command and control is no good."

In the 2022 postseason, the Astros were first matched up against the Seattle Mariners in the 2022 American League Division Series. The Mariners scored seven runs by the 7th inning of Game 1 and promptly scored two runs over the next 29 innings as the Astros rallied to win Game 1 and 2 before winning Game 3 in an eighteen-inning scoreless duel 1-0, as the Astros outscored the Mariners 13-9. It was Baker's first ever LDS sweep as manager, and it guaranteed the Astros a sixth straight appearance in the ALCS. In the 2022 American League Championship Series against the New York Yankees, the Astros won narrowly in Game 1, 2, and 4 (with one blowout win in Game 3) to complete a sweep, making them the third team to sweep the LDS and LCS since 1995. The Game 4 win on October 23 clinched the fourth pennant in the last six seasons for the Astros and it was Baker's third pennant as a manager. It was his sixth postseason series victory with Houston, after having won three postseason matchups in his first 22 seasons. 

The World Series would culminate a historic run for Baker and his Astros. They finished the year with an ERA of 0.83 that saw relievers allow five total earned runs, doing so with a management of high-leverage players such as Bryan Abreu and Rafael Montero despite having a 1.15 regular season ERA (but high walk rate) in Ryne Stanek.
On November 3, Baker won his 50th postseason game as manager, becoming only the fourth in MLB history to do so. On November 5, the Astros defeated the National League champions, the Philadelphia Phillies, in Game 6 of the 2022 World Series, winning Baker his second World Series and first as a manager. At age 73, he is the oldest manager to win the World Series, surpassing Jack McKeon. It was his 28th postseason victory with the Astros, tying him with A. J. Hinch for most playoff wins as an Astro; the Astros went 11–2 in the postseason, becoming the fourth team in the Wild Card era (since 1995) to lose less than three times in the playoffs, and Houston never faced elimination at any point in their postseason; Baker won his first World Series title 40 years after winning one as a player, establishing a record for the longest gap between World Series championships by a player/manager in MLB history.  Baker also became the seventh person in Major League history to win a World Series championship as both a player (1981) and a manager. He also became the third African-American manager to win a World Series after Cito Gaston (1992 and 1993) and Dave Roberts (2020).

Managerial record

Baseball career accomplishments
First manager in major league history to lead five different teams to division titles 
Ninth manager to win both an AL pennant and an NL pennant.
Twelfth manager and first African American manager with 2,000 victories, and first African American manager with 50 postseason victories
Oldest manager to appear in, and win, the World Series (2022)

Broadcasting career
Baker served as an ESPN analyst during the 2006 MLB postseason and served in a similar role during the 2007 season. In 2015, Baker joined TBS as a studio analyst for the final two weeks of their regular season coverage and for their coverage of the National League playoffs.

Personal life

Baker was a member of the United States Marine Corps Reserve from 1969 through 1975. Baker has a wife, Melissa, and two children: Natosha (born 1979), from his first marriage, and Darren Baker (born 1999). Darren was rescued by J. T. Snow from being run over at home plate as a batboy during the 2002 World Series. In 2017, Darren was drafted in the 27th round of the MLB draft by the team his father managed at the time, the Washington Nationals. He decided to play as infielder for the California Golden Bears, and in 2021 he was drafted by the Nationals in the tenth round of the amateur draft, where this time he signed to join the organization. On the same day that Baker won his 2,000th game, his son Darren scored the winning run home for his High A team in Delaware on a sacrifice fly. Baker and his family reside in Granite Bay, California. In the winter of 2001, Baker was diagnosed with prostate cancer during a routine check-up (his father had been diagnosed with the disease eight years prior). Baker had had surgery in December of that year to remove his prostate (his fears over potentially having the cancer return led him to name his three-year old son as a batboy to "show him the world"). Near the end of the 2012 baseball season, Baker was hospitalized for both an irregular heartbeat and a "mini-stroke".

For a period of time, Baker had troubles with the Internal Revenue Service, who had determined that his investments in tax shelters for a number of years (as guided by his brother Victor) was to be disallowed, which would have resulted in penalties of at least a million dollars with interest. When managing the Giants, the IRS garnished his paychecks, leaving him with less than a percent of his $900,000 salary to live on a month; around the time of negotiating his contract in 1999, Magowan loaned him money in case he needed to deal with the IRS, which Baker repaid later. With the help of a tax crisis lawyer (over the course of several years), the issue was resolved, roughly around the time the news was broken by the media in late 2002.

Baker is a member of the National Advisory Board for Positive Coaching Alliance, a national non-profit organization committed to providing student-athletes with a positive, character-building youth sports experience. Baker has appeared in several videos and webinars for this organization, all of which can be found on the group's YouTube channel. Dusty is also owner of Baker Family Wines, along with owner and winemaker Chik Brenneman. Baker was inducted into the Bay Area Sports Hall of Fame in 2015. He returned to the Giants organization in 2018 as a Special Advisor to the CEO.

See also

 Cincinnati Reds award winners and league leaders
 List of Major League Baseball All-Star Game managers
 List of Major League Baseball career assists as a left fielder leaders
 List of Major League Baseball career games played as a left fielder leaders
 List of Major League Baseball career home run leaders
 List of Major League Baseball career putouts as a left fielder leaders
 List of Major League Baseball career runs batted in leaders
 List of Major League Baseball managers by wins
 Los Angeles Dodgers award winners and league leaders
 List of people from Riverside, California

Notes

References

External links

 Dusty Baker Baseball Camp

 Dusty Baker's Awards
 Images of Darren Baker at home plate during the 2002 World Series 1 2 
Venezuelan Professional Baseball League statistics

1949 births
Living people
African-American baseball coaches
African-American baseball managers
African-American baseball players
Arizona Instructional League Braves players
Atlanta Braves players
Austin Braves players
Baseball players from Los Angeles
Chicago Cubs managers
Cincinnati Reds managers
Gold Glove Award winners
Greenwood Braves players
Houston Astros managers
Los Angeles Dodgers players
Major League Baseball center fielders
Major League Baseball left fielders
Manager of the Year Award winners
National League All-Stars
National League Championship Series MVPs
Oakland Athletics players
Richmond Braves players
San Francisco Giants coaches
San Francisco Giants managers
San Francisco Giants players
Silver Slugger Award winners
Tiburones de La Guaira players
American expatriate baseball players in Venezuela
United States Marine Corps reservists
United States Marines
West Palm Beach Braves players
People from Granite Bay, California
Washington Nationals managers
21st-century African-American people
20th-century African-American sportspeople
Baseball players from Riverside, California
World Series-winning managers